Sales Pitch is a 1983 animated short film created by Aardman Animations. It is one of five films released as part of the Conversation Pieces series. The film was directed and animated by Peter Lord and David Sproxton.

References

External links
 Sales Pitch on Youtube

1983 films
1983 animated films
1980s animated short films
British animated short films
Aardman Animations short films
Films directed by Peter Lord
1980s English-language films
1980s British films